was a Japanese art director, photographer, film director and producer, music video director and calligraphist.

Shindō designed over 1000 albums and single cover art for artists including Kyary Pamyu Pamyu, Yumi Matsutoya, Pizzicato Five, Mr. Children, Misia, Hikaru Utada and Glay. He was also a frequent collaborator with Mr. Children and Misia, for whom he has directed several music videos.

In 2010, Shindō became a board member of Mudef, a foundation established by Misia and Rhythmedia CEO Hiroto Tanigawa.

Shindō died from stomach cancer on 10 February 2023, at the age of 75.

Books
 CTPP no Design (1996)
 Zoku CTPP no Design Zecchōhen (2002)
 Bonnō Girls Shashinshū (2005)
 Otoko wa Sore o Gaman Dekinai After Hours Taidanshū (2006)

References

External links
 
 
 
 

1948 births
2023 deaths 
Deaths from stomach cancer
Japanese art directors
Japanese film directors
Japanese music video directors
People from Tokyo
Komazawa University alumni